Zhang Kaiyuan (July 8, 1926 – May 28, 2021) was a Chinese historian and educator.

Biography
Born in Wuhu, Anhui Province, Zhang Kaiyuan was admitted by the History Department of Nanjing University in October 1946, and graduated there. In December 1948, Zhang went to the Central Plains Liberated Areas in Central China University of Political Research as a graduate student. In July 1949 he went to Wuhan together with the school, and became an assistant professor in the Department of History, College of Education faculty, and in September 1951 into the Huazhong University (from  August 1985 - March 1991 it was the Central China Normal University, and Huazhong Normal University).  He has been successively lecturer, associate professor, professor, and finally president then former president (of Huazhong Normal University). He was also President of the Research Center for the History of Chinese Christian Colleges and Universities.

Zhang Kaiyuan held Honorary Doctor of Laws degrees from Augustana College, Soka University and Kansai University.

Publications in English
Zhang, Kaiyuan. Eyewitnesses to Massacre: American Missionaries Bear Witness to Japanese Atrocities in Nanjing. Armonk, N.Y.: M.E. Sharpe, 2001. According to WorldCat, the book is held in 459 libraries  
Zhang, Kaiyuan. Distanciation and Return Analysis on Traditional Culture and Modernization of China. Singapore: Silkroad Press, 2011.

References

External links

1926 births
2021 deaths
People from Wuhu
Chinese historians
Chinese educators
Writers from Anhui
Nanjing University alumni
Kansai University alumni
Academic staff of the Central China Normal University
Presidents of Central China Normal University